Ford Quint Elvidge (November 20, 1892 – July 14, 1980) was an American attorney who was governor of Guam from 1953 to 1956.

Early life
Elvidge was born November 30, 1892, in Oakland, California. He spent his early years in Oakland before moving with his parents and brother in 1911 to Vancouver, British Columbia, Canada.

Career 
Elvidge was an attorney in Seattle, Washington when, in January 1953, President Dwight D. Eisenhower appointed Elvidge to be the second civilian governor of Guam from April 23, 1953, to May 19, 1956.

As governor, Elvidge improved Guam's school system. He also cut spending while improving the efficiency of many departments. Elvidge resigned in 1956.

Personal life 
Elvidge's wife was Anita M. Elvidge, an artist. They have three children, Robert, Marthanna, and Carolyn. Elvidge and her family lived in Seattle, Washington, and Guam.

On July 14, 1982, Elvidge died at the age of 87 in Seattle, Washington.

References

Governors of Guam
Lawyers from Seattle
1892 births
1980 deaths
Politicians from Oakland, California
Washington (state) lawyers
Washington (state) Republicans
Guamanian Republicans
20th-century American lawyers
 American expatriates in Canada